"King of the Narrow Sea" is the fourth episode of the first season of the HBO fantasy drama television series House of the Dragon. It first aired on September 11, 2022. It was written by Ira Parker, and directed by Clare Kilner.

The plot follows Rhaenyra's return from her tour of choosing  a consort, Daemon's return from Stepstones, the growing bonding between the two aforementioned characters, and the revocation of Otto Hightower as King Viserys' Hand.

It received highly positive critical reviews, with praise going towards Parker's screenplay, Kilner's direction, and performances of the cast, especially Paddy Considine and Matt Smith's.

Plot
On a realm-wide tour to choose a spouse, Princess Rhaenyra Targaryen, accompanied by Ser Criston Cole, has travelled to Storm's End. With Lord Boremund Baratheon's guidance, she meets and rejects countless suitors. Rhaenyra abandons the tour while a fight erupts between two suitors, in which one, an adolescent boy, kills another by sword. As her ship approaches King's Landing, her uncle, Prince Daemon, flies past on his dragon, Caraxes, victoriously returning from his three-year military campaign in the Stepstones.

Daemon enters the throne room, wearing a crown and claiming the title "King of the Narrow Sea". He gives up the crown to his brother, King Viserys, swearing his allegiance. As the reconciled brothers celebrate at a feast, Queen Alicent confides her loneliness to Rhaenyra, who also admits missing their friendship. Daemon speaks to Rhaenyra, advising her to indulge her desires while fulfilling royal duties.

Late at night, Rhaenyra, disguised as a boy, sneaks out with Daemon to explore King's Landing's seamier areas. They drink, attend a bawdy play, and visit a brothel, where Daemon removes Rhaenyra's disguise and seduces her. Although she is willing, he is unable to consummate the affair. A frustrated Daemon leaves. Returning to the Red Keep, Rhaenyra seduces Criston, who is initially reluctant due to his Kingsguard oath of chastity, but they ultimately fornicate.

Ser Otto Hightower learns about Daemon and Rhaenyra's exploits from a spy called the White Worm. Otto informs Viserys, who reacts angrily to the news, as well as Otto's apparent spying on Rhaenyra. Alicent overhears their conversation. She confronts Rhaenyra privately, inadvertently revealing Otto's spying to Rhaenyra. Rhaenyra denies having sex with Daemon. Viserys angrily confronts a disheveled and hungover Daemon, who seemingly confirms the accusations and proposes to wed Rhaenyra. Viserys claims Daemon only wants the marriage to gain the crown, and exiles his brother back to the Vale. Alicent tells Viserys her belief that Rhaenyra is still a virgin.

To avoid scandal, Viserys orders Rhaenyra to marry Ser Laenor Velaryon. In exchange, she demands her father dismiss Otto as his Hand, claiming he manipulates the king for personal ambitions. Viserys does so. He later sends Grand Maester Mellos to give her an abortifacient drink to prevent any "unwanted consequences."

Production

Writing and filming 
"King of the Narrow Sea" was written by Ira Parker and directed by Clare Kilner, marking their first time in the Game of Thrones franchise.

The title of the episode refers to the title held by Daemon Targaryen.

Casting 
The episode stars Paddy Considine, Matt Smith, Rhys Ifans, Fabien Frankel, Sonoya Mizuno, Milly Alcock, Emily Carey, Graham McTavish, and Jefferson Hall.

Reception

Ratings
An estimated 1.81 million viewers watched "King of the Narrow Sea" during its first broadcast on HBO on September 11, 2022. The four broadcasts of the episode on HBO dueing the premiere night attracted a total of 2.47 million viewers. Viewership for the show across all platforms in the US was 5% higher than the previous episode.

Critical response
The episode received highly positive critical reviews. On the review aggregator Rotten Tomatoes, it holds an approval rating of 87% based on 116 reviews, with an average rating of 7.6/10. The site's critical consensus said, "Making for deeply uncomfortable family viewing, 'King of the Narrow Sea' trades dragonflame for dangerous liaisons and goes a long way towards deepening House of the Dragon's web of intrigue."

Writing for GamesRadar+, Molly Edwards gave it a rating of 4.5 out of 5 stars and said, "After the dazzling, gruesome spectacle of last week, 'King of the Narrow Sea' is a return to what this series does so well: twisty game playing with shrouded motivations. The episode deftly leaves every single member of the main cast in an impossible situation by the time the credits roll." Den of Geek's Alec Bojalad rated it 4 out of 5 stars and wrote, "The show's approach to time remains a double-edged Valyrian sword. House of the Dragon does so many of the little things well that you wish it had more time to indulge them." The Telegraph's Michael Deacon also rated it 4 out of 5 stars and named it "the best episode of the series so far."

Jenna Scherer of The A.V. Club graded it with a "B+" and gave praise to Parker's writing, Kilner's directing, Djawadi's score, and the performances of Smith and Alcock. Furthermore, for Parker and Kilner, Scherer stated that the two have successfully created "a narrative and emotional drive that House Of The Dragon has been sorely lacking. It's tense, sexy, smart, and even, dare I say it, fun." IGN's Helen O'Hara gave it a "good" 7 out of 10 and wrote in her verdict: "This quieter, almost action-free episode is once again focused on dynastic matters and sexposition after the action of last week. It’s well played, shot, and paced, but its unhappy, self-involved characters need a little leavening if they’re going to match the heights of Game Of Thrones." She also praised the writing, production values, and performances, particularly Considine's. Jeremy Egner of The New York Times was also favorable of the episode and praised the on-screen dynamic performances of Considine and Alcock.

References

External links
 "King of the Narrow Sea" at HBO
 

2022 American television episodes
House of the Dragon episodes